is a village located in Niigata Prefecture, Japan. , the village had an estimated population of 4,578 in 1613 households, and a population density of 174 persons per km².

Geography
Kariwa is located in central Niigata Prefecture, sandwiched between the cities of Nagaoka and Kashiwazaki, and consists of two discontinuous areas. Kariwa is located near the Sea of Japan but has no coastline. It takes over 3 hours to reach Tokyo by train (using local trains and Jōetsu Shinkansen from Nagaoka), or by car on the Kan-Etsu Expressway.

Surrounding municipalities
Niigata Prefecture
Kashiwazaki
Nagaoka

Demographics
Per Japanese census data, the population of Kariwa peaked at around the year 1990, and has declined steadily since.

History
The area of present-day Kariwa was part of ancient Echigo Province and was part of the tenryō holdings of the Tokugawa shogunate during the Edo period. The village of Kariwa was established within Kariwa District, Niigata with the creation of the modern municipalities system on April 1, 1889.  On September 30, 1956 a part of the neighbouring village of Nakadori was absorbed into Kariwa. Likewise, on April 10, 1959 a part of neighbouring Futada village was absorbed into Kariwa

2007 Chūetsu offshore earthquake
A magnitude 6.8 earthquake hit off the coast of Kashiwazaki, killing 10 people, and injuring more than 1,200, causing massive power outages. Total over 340 houses were destroyed and thousands of people were forced to live at the shelters. The quake caused a fire at Kashiwazaki-Kariwa nuclear power plant in an electrical transformer, a leak of water from the spent fuel pool, and a host of other safety related events.

Economy
Together with Kashiwazaki city, Kariwa is the home of the Tokyo Electric Power Company's Kashiwazaki-Kariwa nuclear power plant, once the largest nuclear generating station in the world by net electrical power rating. After the April 2011 earthquake, all restarted units were shut down and safety improvements are being carried out.  no units have been restarted.

Education
Kariwa has three public elementary schools and one public middle school operated by the village government. The village does not have a high school.

Transportation

Railway
 JR East - Echigo Line
 -

Highway
 Hokuriku Expressway

Sister cities
  Half Moon Bay, California, United States

Local attractions
 Kariwa Midden (Prehistoric site)
 Tohuku-in (temple)
 Joraku-ji (temple)
 Hozo-ji (temple)
 Katsuyama castle remains (Now used as hiking paths)
 Akada castle remains (Now used as hiking paths)
 Kariwa Village Life Learning Center "Rapika"

Festivals
 Takiya Toro Oshiai Matsuri (Lantern Battle Festival) (April)
 Peach Flower Festival (April)
 Kariwa-mura Furusato Matsuri (Village Festival) (August)

References

External links

Official Website 

Villages in Niigata Prefecture
Kariwa, Niigata